Jack Page may refer to:

Jack Page (footballer, born 1886) (1886–1951), English footballer who played for Everton, Cardiff City and Merthyr Town
Jack Page (footballer, born 1893) (1893–1964), English footballer who played for Sunderland 
Jack Page (figure skater) (1900–1947), British figure skater
Jack Page (politician) (1950–2020), American politician in the Alabama House of Representatives
Jack Page (musician) (2016-Present), Kiwi musician
Jack Page, character in Air Cadet

See also
John Page (disambiguation)